Tai Po Central is one of the 19 constituencies in the Tai Po District.

The constituency returns one district councillor to the Tai Po District Council, with an election every four years. The seat has been currently held by Au Chun-wah.

Tai Po Central constituency is loosely based on Tai Po Centre with estimated population of 13,645.

Councillors represented

1982 to 1985

1985 to 1988

1988 to 1994

1994 to present

Election results

2010s

2000s

1990s

1980s

References

Tai Po
Constituencies of Hong Kong
Constituencies of Tai Po District Council
1982 establishments in Hong Kong
Constituencies established in 1982